The Portfolio Committee on Tourism is a portfolio committee in the National Assembly of South Africa. The committee scrutinises the work of the Department of Tourism and South African Tourism.

Since September 2021, Tandi Mahambehlala of the African National Congress has served as Chair of the Committee.

Membership
The committee consists of 11 members: six from the African National Congress, two from the Democratic Alliance, one from the Economic Freedom Fighters and two members from other parties. As of December 2020, the committee's current members are as follows:

The following people serve as alternate members:

See also
Committees of the Parliament of South Africa

References

Committees of the National Assembly of South Africa